A W18 engine is an eighteen-cylinder piston engine with three banks of six cylinders in a W configuration.

The W18 layout is rarely used, with the only production examples being several aircraft during the 1920s and 1930s. Prototype W18 engines were produced for concept cars predecessors to the Bugatti Veyron in the late 1990s.

Aircraft usage
An early example is the 1929 Hispano-Suiza 18R, an aircraft racing engine produced in limited quantities in France. This was followed in 1934 by the Isotta Fraschini Asso 750, which was built in Italy and used in several flying boats. The Asso 750 was water-cooled and used an angle of 60 degrees between banks. The 1943 Tatra T955 was a prototype diesel aircraft engine which used a W18 layout.

Automotive usage
The W18 layout has been considered for use in motor vehicles by two manufacturers, although neither reached production. In 1967, Scuderia Ferrari built a prototype W3 engine as a feasibility study for a  W18 engine to use in Formula One. In the late 1990s, the Bugatti EB 118, Bugatti EB 218, Bugatti 18/3 Chiron and Bugatti EB 18.4 Veyron concept cars were fitted with W18 engines, prior to the production version of the Bugatti Veyron using a W16 engine instead.

Marine usage
The W18 layout has been used on the high seas; CRM Motori SpA marine engines.

References

Piston engine configurations
18